After "Invisible Man" by Ralph Ellison, the Prologue is a color photograph by Jeff Wall created in 1999–2000. It has the dimensions of 174 by 250.8 cm and is exhibited in a lightbox. The staged photograph belongs to the collection of the Museum of Modern Art in New York City.

Description
The photograph was staged in a Vancouver, British Columbia, studio, and is inspired by the prologue of the celebrated novel by African-American writer Ralph Ellison, Invisible Man (1952). The protagonist of the novel lives in a basement of a building in Harlem, where he has wired the entire ceiling with 1369 lights, whose electricity is illegally siphoned. Wall took inspiration from the description at the novel and from his own imagination. The photograph depicts the unnamed leading character of the novel in the comfort of his basement, with several commodities, poorly organized, but where the large amount of illumination stands out.
Wall explained:
"The picture […] ought to overcome the subject matter and make its source superfluous," "That viewer, not having read the book and not intending to read it, by still enjoying and appreciating the picture can be thought of as having written his or her own novel. The viewer's own experience and associations will do that. These unwritten novels are a form in which the experience of art is carried over into everyday life."

References

1999 in art
2000 in art
1990s photographs
2000s photographs
Color photographs
Photographs by Jeff Wall
Photographs of the Museum of Modern Art (New York City)